Andrew Gulickson (December 18, 1856 – April 29, 1941) was a member of the Wisconsin State Assembly.

Gulickson was born at Drangedal in Telemark, Norway. He moved to the United States during 1868 with his parents. The family settled in Barron County, Wisconsin. Gulickson was a member of the Assembly from 1911 to 1913. He was a Republican. He died in 1941.

References

External links

1856 births
1941 deaths
People from Drangedal
Norwegian emigrants to the United States
People from Barron County, Wisconsin
Members of the Wisconsin State Assembly